Otto Christian Blandow (5 August 1778, Waren –  15 March 1810, Waren) was a German apothecary and botanist, specializing in the field of bryology.

He trained under Joachim Christian Timm (1734-1805) in Malchin, afterwards working as an apothecary in Rostock, Neubrandenburg, Anklam, Woldegk and Waren.

The genus Blandowia was named in his honor by Carl Ludwig Willdenow (1765-1812). Since 1875, a collection of his mosses has been kept at the British Museum of Natural History (250 specimens in 5 fascicles).

Publications 
 Index muscorum frondosorum exsiccatorum: fasciculi primi [-quinti], 1804.
 Systematisch-tabellarische Sammlung von Laubmoosen, 1808 – Systematic-tabular collection of mosses.
 Uebersicht der Mecklenburgischen Moose nach alphábetischer Ordnung, 1809  – Survey of mosses from Mecklenburg in alphabetical order.

References 

1778 births
1810 deaths
People from Waren (Müritz)
People from the Duchy of Mecklenburg-Schwerin
19th-century German botanists
Bryologists
Apothecaries